Melanie Fischer (born 27 January 1986) is an Austrian football midfielder currently playing for Wacker Innsbruck in the ÖFB-Frauenliga. She previously played for SV Neulengbach (with which she also played the UEFA Women's Cup) and SG Ardagger/Neustadtl in Austria and Bayern Munich in the German Bundesliga. She is a member of the Austrian national team.

References

1986 births
Living people
Austrian women's footballers
FC Bayern Munich (women) players
Austrian expatriate women's footballers
Austrian expatriate sportspeople in Germany
Austria women's international footballers
SV Neulengbach (women) players
Expatriate women's footballers in Germany
Women's association football midfielders
ÖFB-Frauenliga players